This is a list of films produced in the Netherlands during the 1950s. The films are produced in the Dutch language.

1950s
Films
Dutch